Ophionereididae are a family of brittle stars.

Systematics
Ophionereididae has been placed (along with Ophiocomidae) to the superfamily Ophiocomidea and infraorder Chilophiurina or suborder Chilophiurina in different classifications. Ophionereididae contains the following genera:
Ophiocrasis
Ophiodoris
Ophionereis
Ophioneroides
Ophiotriton

References

 
Ophiurida
Echinoderm families